Pristimantis cantitans is a species of frog in the family Strabomantidae. It is endemic to Venezuela and only known from its type locality, the summit of Cerro Yaví ( above sea level), a sandstone table-top mountain (tepui) in the Amazonas State. The specific name cantitans alludes to the day-and-night calling behavior of this species and is derived from the Latin cantito (="to sing often").

Description
Males measure  and females  in snout–vent length. The body is brown in color with some darker markings. Some individuals may have scattered yellow spots or a lighter brown dorsum with clear, wavy blackish brown markings. The dorsal skin is only weakly granular and rugose; ventral skin is areolate. The tympanum is distinct. The snout is rounded. The upper eyelids have small warts. The fingers lack webbing but the toes have weak lateral fringes and basal webbing.

The species is nocturnal but males call during both day and night from concealed sites in caves and from beneath thick moss mats growing over sandstone.

Habitat and conservation
It has been collected on vegetation in montane tepui forest. No threats to this species are known.

References

cantitans
Amphibians of Venezuela
Endemic fauna of Venezuela
Taxa named by Charles W. Myers
Taxa named by Maureen Ann Donnelly
Amphibians described in 1996
Taxonomy articles created by Polbot
Amphibians of the Tepuis